The 1932 UCI Road World Championships took place in Rome, Italy.

Events Summary

References

 
UCI Road World Championships by year
W
R
R